Wazzin is a town in the western Tripolitania region at the western boundary of Libya. It serves as a border crossing to Tunisia.

Wazzin is in the desert near the western end of the Nafusa Mountains range, in the Nalut District.

History

Old town
The town is the seat of Gasr Wazzin, which was built in 1482 CE (860 AH anno hegirae).  The Gasr has 360 rooms on 4 floors. The building has a rectangular shape, with a cistern for storing water in its center. It was used as a fortress and granary.

The Gasr Wazzin is surrounded by the old town district of present-day Wazzin, whose buildings are mainly gypsum based masonry. A network of tunnels is below this historic portion, and is reserved for women traveling around the old town, without encountering non-familial men.

2011 Libyan civil war

On 21 April 2011, during the 2011 Libyan civil war, anti-Gaddafi fighters took over the control of the border crossing and 13 pro-Gaddafi officers defected to Tunisia.  Since then control has been in flux. The Battles in Wazzin, the border, and nearby Nafusa Mountains are a campaign known as the 2011 Nafusa Mountain Campaign. The campaign has ended in a definite rebel victory with the capture of Gharyan, the last loyalist stronghold in the area.

Demographics
The people of Wazzin are divided into two clans, Awlad Mahmoud and Arrbai'a, both of which have several subclans as shown in the table below.

See also
2011 Nafusa Mountains Campaign

Notes

References

External links
 "Wazzin Map — Satellite Images of Wazzin" Maplandia World Gazetteer

Libya–Tunisia border crossings
Populated places in Nalut District
Tripolitania
Baladiyat of Libya